There are over 94 undergraduate degrees, 48 graduate programs, and 6 associate degrees in many different disciplines offered at the University of Guelph. The history of achievement in biomedical science, agriculture and veterinary medicine and the modern focus on life sciences are some of the strengths that define the university. The university is home to 19,400 full-time and part-time undergraduate students, 2,515 full-time and part-time graduate students and almost 3000 faculty and staff. Over 99.8% of students entering the University of Guelph for the first time have academic averages of 75% and above. Guelph students also have the highest graduation rate among Canadian comprehensive universities (at 89%), 5.8% higher than the national average.

Undergraduate programs
As of the 2020-2021 academic year.

Undergraduate Majors

Graduate programs

Joint graduate programs
 Guelph-Waterloo Center for Graduate Work in Chemistry and Biochemistry (GWC2) is one of Canada’s largest and most successful graduate schools.
 Guelph-Waterloo Physics Institute (GWPI) is a joint graduate program offered by the Departments of Physics at the University of Waterloo and Guelph.
 Guelph-McMaster Collaborative MA Program in Public Policy and Administration
 The Guelph-Waterloo MA Program in Public Issues Anthropology
 Tri-University Graduate History Program (Waterloo, Laurier, Guelph)

References

University of Guelph